Wax and Wane is a Hong Kong television drama produced by Television Broadcasts Limited (TVB). The story follows the lives of two rival families in the Chinese noodles business.

Man Family

Yung Family

Chan Family

Wong Family

Other casts

See also
Wax and Wane
List of Wax and Wane episodes

Wax and Wane
Wax and Wane